The Morrissey Formation is a stratigraphic unit of Late Jurassic (Portlandian) age in the Western Canada Sedimentary Basin.

Stratigraphy and lithology 

The Morrissey Formation is the basal unit of the Kootenay Group. It consists of massive, cliff-forming, fine- to coarse-grained sandstone, with minor beds and lenses of conglomeratic sandstone, and rare beds of siltstone, mudstone, carbonaceous mudstone, and coal. The sequence coarsens upward and, in most areas, it can be subdivided into two members, the Weary Ridge Member at the base, and the Moose Mountain Member at the top:

Environment of deposition 

The Morrissey sediments were derived from newly rising mountain ranges to the west and transported eastward by river systems. They were deposited along the edge of the Western Interior Seaway in extensive littoral, deltaic and beach environments. Thin beds of carbonaceous mudstone and coal near the top of the formation may have been deposited in interdune, lacustrine or swale environments.

Paleontology and age 

Fossils, including microfossils, are very rare in the Morrissey Formation. Several genera of molluscs (e.g., Oxytoma, Modiolus, and possibly Pachyteuthis) have been collected from the Weary Ridge Member. A single impression and a few fragments of the ammonite Titanites occidentalis, which have been recovered from the top of the Moose Mountain Member, indicate a Late Jurassic (Portlandian) age. Impressions of logs are also known from the top of Moose Mountain Member.

Thickness and distribution 

The Morrissey Formation extends from the Flathead River area of southeastern British Columbia near the Canada–United States border to the North Saskatchewan River in western Alberta. It has a maximum recorded thickness of  near Mist Mountain and the Highwood Pass in Alberta, and it thins eastward, reaching a zero edge along the eastern foothills of the Canadian Rockies in Alberta.

Relationship to other units 

The Morrissey Formation abruptly but conformably overlies the "Passage Beds" at the top of the Fernie Formation, and is in turn abruptly but conformably overlain by the Mist Mountain Formation. To the north in the vicinity of the North Saskatchewan River it interfingers with and grades into the Nikanassin Formation. To the east it was truncated by pre-Aptian erosion and is unconformably overlain by the Cadomin Formation. Its correlation south of the Canada-United States border in Montana is uncertain.

References 

Geologic formations of Canada
Tithonian Stage
Stratigraphy of Alberta
Stratigraphy of British Columbia